Alexander Kluge (born 14 February 1932) is a German author, philosopher, academic and film director.

Early life, education and early career
Kluge was born in Halberstadt, Province of Saxony (now Saxony-Anhalt), Germany.

After growing up during World War II, he studied history, law and music at the University of Marburg Germany, and the Johann Wolfgang Goethe University of Frankfurt am Main in Germany. He received his doctorate in law in 1956.

While studying in Frankfurt, Kluge befriended the philosopher Theodor W. Adorno, who was teaching at the Institute for Social Research, or Frankfurt School. Kluge served as a legal counsel for the Institute, and began writing his earliest stories during this period. At Adorno's suggestion, he also began to investigate filmmaking, and in 1958, Adorno introduced him to German filmmaker Fritz Lang, for whom Kluge worked as an assistant on the making of The Tiger of Eschnapur.

Cinematic works
Kluge directed his first film in 1960, Brutality in Stone, a twelve-minute, black and white, lyrical montage work which, against the German commercial (Papa's Kino) cinematic amnesia of the prior decade, inaugurated an exploration of the Nazi past. The film premièred in 1961 at what would become the showcase for the new generation of German filmmakers, the Westdeutsche Kurzfilmtage (now known as the International Short Film Festival Oberhausen) in Oberhausen, Germany.

Kluge was one of twenty-six signatories to the Oberhausen Manifesto of 1962, which marked the launch of the New German Cinema. That same year, with filmmakers Edgar Reitz and Detlev Schleiermacher, Kluge established the Ulm Institut für Filmgestaltung, to promote the critical and aesthetic practices of Young German Film and the New German Cinema.

In 1965 he was a member of the jury at the 15th Berlin International Film Festival.

He has gone on to direct a number of films which have an inherent critique of commercial cinema and television through the creation of a counter-public sphere and their deployment of experimental forms, including montage. They include Abschied von Gestern (Yesterday Girl) (1966), an adaptation of Kluge's story "Anita G."; Die Artisten in der Zirkuskuppel: Ratlos (Artists under the Big Top: Perplexed) (1968); and The Assault of the Present on the Rest of Time (1985).

In 2017, Kluge and his studio are featured in the film Finite and Infinite Games by artist Sarah Morris. The film, which focuses around the Elbphilharmonie in Hamburg, Germany, includes debate between Kluge and Morris on architecture, music, and the religious philosophy of American academic James P. Carse.

Television work 

In 1987, Kluge founded the television production company Development Company for Television Program mbH (DCTP), which produces late-night and night-time independent television slots on the private channels RTL Television, Sat.1, and VOX.

Much of the DCTP programs consist of television documentaries by Kluge (often characterized by the lack of spoken narration and a heavy reliance upon text as well as graphical montages and image editing) as well as many interviews Kluge leads with various international personalities from the fields of arts, entertainment, science, philosophy, and politics. Some of the interviewed are fictitious characters portrayed by professional actors Helge Schneider and Peter Berling, or factual people parodied by the two, including, but not limited to, Adolf Hitler, historical Roman generals, Napoleon's political advisors, or the lawyer of Michael Jackson.

Beside Kluge's own productions, DCTP also co-produces so-called Magazinsendungen, which are investigatory programs in cooperation with Der Spiegel (SPIEGEL TV), Stern, Süddeutsche Zeitung (Süddeutsche TV), Neue Zürcher Zeitung (NZZ Format), and the British Broadcasting Corporation.

Literary works
Kluge is also one of the major German fiction writers of the late-20th century and an important social critic. His fictional works, which tend toward the short story form, are significant for their formal experimentation and insistently critical thematics. Constituting a form of analytical fiction, they utilize techniques of narrative disruption, mixed genres, interpolation of non-literary texts and documents, and perspectival shifts. The texts frequently employ a flat, ironic tone. One frequent effect approximates what Viktor Shklovsky and the Russian formalists identified as defamiliarization or ostranenie. In an interview with 032c magazine, Kluge described his point of view on writing with a quote by Georg Büchner: "I've always wanted to see what my head looks like from above." Kluge explains that when "writing literary texts, you look—if you're going about it correctly—down to yourself, to your head from above. Then you no longer have a relationship with yourself. At the most, you have trust in yourself that a text will emerge from this and that you still have the sovereignty and the strength to throw it away if it amounts to nothing." Kluge has used several of his stories as the bases for his films.

Kluge's major works of social criticism include Öffentlichkeit und Erfahrung. Zur Organisationsanalyse von bürgerlicher und proletarischer Öffentlichkeit, co-written with Oskar Negt and originally published in 1972, and "Geschichte und Eigensinn", also co-authored with Negt.  "Öffentlichkeit und Erfahrung" has been translated into English as Public Sphere and Experience: Toward an Analysis of the Bourgeois and Proletarian Public Sphere and "Geschichte und Eigensinn" was translated into English as History and Obstinacy, published in 2014 by Zone Books.

"Public Sphere and Experience" revisits and expands Jürgen Habermas's notion of the public sphere (which he articulated in his book Structural Transformation of the Public Sphere) and calls for the development of a new "proletarian public sphere" grounded in the life experience of the working class. "Geschichte und Eigensinn" continues this project and tries to rethink the very nature of proletarian experience and develops a theory of "living labour" grounded in the work of Karl Marx.

He has also published numerous texts on literary, film and television criticism. In discussing his literary technique of blending fiction and reality with author Gary Indiana, Kluge also offers a critique of the media industry's presentation of "reality", which he asserts is intrinsically false:
 ...Human beings are not interested in reality. They can't be; it's the human essence. They have wishes. These wishes are strictly opposed to any ugly form of reality. They prefer to lie than to become divorced from their wishes...[they] forget everything and can give up everything except this principle of misunderstanding reality, the subjective... If this is real, then the media industry is realistic in telling fiction, and the construction of reality founded on this basis can only lie. This is one of the reasons why history isn't realistic: it's not documentary, it's not genuine, and it's not necessary.

Learning Processes with a Deadly Outcome (1973) is one of Kluge's original contributions to the science-fiction genre.

In 2000, he published Chronik der Gefühle (Chronicle of Feelings), which critic Matthew D. Miller describes as a "modern epic".

Since 2016 Kluge has been collaborating with the American writer Ben Lerner. Their collaborations are collected in The Snows of Venice, published in 2018 by Spector Books.

Personal life
His sister, Alexandra Kluge, was a film actress.

Awards and honors
His awards include the Italian Literature Prize Isola d'Elba (1967), and almost every major German-language literary prize, including the Heinrich von Kleist Prize (1985), the Heinrich-Böll-Preis (1993) and the Schiller Memorial Prize (2001). Kluge received the Hanns-Joachim-Friedrichs-Award for TV Journalism (2001). He has also received the Georg Büchner Prize (2003), Germany's highest literary award. In recent years Kluge received the triennial Theodor W. Adorno Award of 2009. In 2010 Kluge received the Grimme Award, one of the most important German television awards, in the category "Special mention" in honour of his lifetime achievements.

Selected filmography
 1966 Yesterday Girl (director and screenwriter)
 1968 Artists Under the Big Top: Perplexed (director, producer and screenwriter)
 1973 Gelegenheitsarbeit einer Sklavin (director and screenwriter)
 1974  (co-director: Edgar Reitz)
 1976  (director, narrator, producer and screenwriter)
 1978 Germany in Autumn (director and screenwriter, along with three other filmmakers)
 1979  (director and producer)
 1980 The Candidate (director)
 1982 Biermann-Film (director)
 1982 War and Peace (director and screenwriter (adapted from his book))
 1983  (director, narrator, producer and screenwriter)
 1985 Vermischte Nachrichten (director, producer and screenwriter)
 1986 The Blind Director (director and screenwriter)
 1989  (producer)
 1995 Die Nacht der Regisseure (actor – as himself (uncredited))
 2008 Nachrichten aus der ideologischen Antike: Marx – Eisenstein – Das Kapital (director and screenwriter)

Selected bibliography

 Die Universitäts-Selbstverwaltung. Ihre Geschichte und gegenwärtige Rechtsform (1958).
 Lebensläufe (1962). Attendance List for a Funeral, trans. Leila Vennewitz (1966); later reprinted as Case Histories (1988).
This collection includes the story "Anita G.", which Kluge adapted into the film Yesterday Girl. Vennewitz's translation does not include "Korti" and in its place includes three additional stories not in the original German collection: "Attendance List for a Funeral", "Sergeant Major Hans Peickert", and "Mandorf".
 Schlachtbeschreibung (1964). The Battle, trans. Leila Vennewitz (1967).
 Die Artisten in der Zirkuskuppel: ratlos. Die Ungläubige. Projekt Z. Sprüche der Leni Peickert (1968)
 Öffentlichkeit und Erfahrung – Zur Organisationsanalyse von bürgerlicher und proletarischer Öffentlichkeit (with Oskar Negt) (1972). Public Sphere and Experience: Analysis of the Bourgeois and Proletarian Public, trans. Peter Labany, Jamie Owen Daniel, and Assenka Oksiloff (Verso Books, 2016).
 Lernprozesse mit tödlichem Ausgang (1973). Learning Processes with a Deadly Outcome, trans. Christopher Pavsek (Duke University Press, 1996).
 Gelegenheitsarbeit einer Sklavin. Zur realistischen Methode (1975).
 Unheimlichkeit der Zeit. Neue Geschichten (1977). New Stories, Notebooks 1–18: "The Uncanniness of Time". A collection of several hundred stories, some only one-page long, interspersed with documents, charts and images.
 Die Patriotin. Texte/Bilder 1–6 (1979).
 Geschichte und Eigensinn (with Oskar Negt) (1981). History and Obstinacy, trans. Richard Langston (Zone Books, 2014).
 Die Macht der Gefühle (1984). The Power of Feelings.
Maßverhältnisse des Politischen (with Oskar Negt) (1992).
 Die Wächter des Sarkophags. 10 Jahre Tschernobyl (1996).
 In Gefahr und größter Not bringt der Mittelweg den Tod. Texte zu Kino, Film, Politik (1999).
 Chronik der Gefühle (2000). Chronicle of Feelings. In two volumes: Basisgeschichten and Lebensläufe. Includes, in addition to a large amount of new material: Schlachtbeschreibung; Unheimlichkeit der Zeit; Lernprozesse mit tödlichem Ausgang; and Lebensläufe.
 Der unterschätzte Mensch (with Oskar Negt) (2001). The Undervalued Man. In two volumes. The first book includes: Suchbegriffe (26 conversations and interviews); Öffentlichkeit und Erfahrung; and Maßverhältnisse des Politischen (revised). The second book is Geschichte und Eigensinn.
 Verdeckte Ermittlung (2001).
 Die Kunst, Unterschiede zu machen (2003).
 Die Lücke, die der Teufel lässt. Im Umfeld des neuen Jahrhunderts (2003). The Devil's Blind Spot, trans. Martin Chalmers and Michael Hulse (New Directions, 2004). This collection of 500 stories includes some earlier works; an abridged English-language translation appeared in 2004 containing 173 of the 500 stories.
 Vom Nutzen ungelöster Probleme (2003).
 Fontane – Kleist – Deutschland – Büchner: Zur Grammatik der Zeit (2004).
 Tür an Tür mit einem anderen Leben. 350 neue Geschichten (2006).
 Geschichten vom Kino (2007). Cinema Stories, trans. Martin Brady and Helen Hughes (New Directions, 2007).
 Der Luftangriff auf Halberstadt am 8. April 1945 (2008). Air Raid, trans. Martin Chalmers (Seagull Books, 2012).
 Soll und Haben. Fernsehgespräche (with Joseph Vogl) (2009).
 Das Labyrinth der zärtlichen Kraft. 166 Liebesgeschichten (2009). The Labyrinth of Tender Force: 166 Love Stories, trans. Wieland Hoban (Seagull Books, 2019).

 Dezember (with Gerhard Richter) (2010). December, trans. Martin Chalmers (Seagull Books, 2012).

 Das Bohren harter Bretter. 133 politische Geschichten (2011). Drilling Through Hard Boards: 133 Political Stories, trans. Wieland Hoban (Seagull Books, 2017).
 Das fünfte Buch: Neue Lebensläufe. 402 Geschichten (2012).
 Personen und Reden (2012).
 Die Entsprechung einer Oase. Essay für die digitale Generation (2013).
 "Wer ein Wort des Trostes spricht, ist ein Verräter." 48 Geschichten für Fritz Bauer (2013). Anyone Who Utters a Consoling Word Is a Traitor: 48 Stories for Fritz Bauer, trans. Alta L. Price (Seagull Books, 2020).
 Nachricht von ruhigen Momenten (with Gerhard Richter) (2013). Dispatches from Moments of Calm, trans. Nathaniel McBride (Seagull Books, 2016).
 30. April 1945 (with Reinhard Jirgl) (2014). 30 April 1945: The Day Hitler Shot Himself and Germany's Integration with the West Began, trans. Wieland Hoban and Iain Galbraith (Seagull Books, 2015).
 Le Moment fugitif (2014).
 Kongs große Stunde. Chronik des Zusammenhangs (2015). Kong's Finest Hour: A Chronicle of Connections (Seagull Books, 2021).
 Ferngespräche. Über Eisenstein, Marx, das Kapital, die Liebe und die Macht der zärtlichen Kraft (with Rainer Stollmann) (2016).
 Weltverändernder Zorn: Nachricht von den Gegenfüßlern (with Georg Baselitz) (2017). World-Changing Rage: News of the Antipodeans, trans. Katy Derbyshire (Seagull Books, 2019).
 Schnee über Venedig (with Ben Lerner) (2018). The Snows of Venice (2018).
 Russland-Kontainer (2020). Russia Container, trans. Alexander Booth (Seagull Books, 2022).
 Trotzdem (with Ferdinand von Schirach) (2020).
 Senkblei der Geschichten (with Joseph Vogl) (2020).
 Zirkus / Kommentar (2022).
 Das Buch der Kommentare. Unruhiger Garten der Seele (2022).

Compilations in English 

 Alexander Kluge: Theoretical Writings, Stories, and an Interview. October, Vol. 46 (1988).
Temple of the Scapegoat: Opera Stories (New Directions, 2018)
Difference and Orientation: An Alexander Kluge Reader. Edited by Richard Langston (Cornell University, 2019)

References

External links

 
 
 
 Senses of Cinema: Great Directors Critical Database
 Hans-Ulrich Obrist's Interview with Alexander Kluge
 Kluge-Müller interviews via Cornell University
 Lohengrin in Leningrad Excerpted from Cinema Stories, featured in SOFT TARGETS v.2.1
 Download Movies
 Download Movies
 Complete Documentation of Pictures and Texts from His Films 
 

1932 births
Living people
People from Halberstadt
Mass media people from Saxony-Anhalt
People from the Province of Saxony
Schiller Memorial Prize winners
Kleist Prize winners
Georg Büchner Prize winners
Commanders Crosses of the Order of Merit of the Federal Republic of Germany
Members of the Academy of Arts, Berlin
German male writers
Best Director German Film Award winners
Directors of Golden Lion winners